A Canção do Amor is the eleventh album in the live praise and worship series of Contemporary worship music by Diante do Trono.

About the project 
In the pre-recording of the A Canção do Amor, the mining group released the Príncipe da Paz album, recorded at the Apoteose Square, in Rio de Janeiro.

The album was recorded at Chevrolet Hall in Recife, Pernambuco, on 4 and 5 July 2008.

All songs were composed by Ana Paula Valadão.

The album sold about 150,000 copies in Brazil so getting the platinum disc charted hits in churches throughout Brazil as "Confio Em Teu Amor" and "A Canção do Amor".

Track listings

CD

DVD

References 

2008 live albums
2008 video albums
Live video albums
Portuguese-language live albums
Diante do Trono video albums
Diante do Trono live albums